Kerala state has made many initiatives in the process of decentralization of powers. Creation of a tribunal for adjudication of conflicts between local governments and the citizens is an initiative of that sort.

Creation of the tribunal in Kerala
The Government of Kerala constituted the Tribunal for Local Self Government Institutions to hear appeals and revisions as per the Kerala Panchayat Raj Act 1994 and the Kerala Municipality Act 1994 as per G.O. 52/04/LSGD dt. 5.2.2004,. The headquarters of the Tribunal is at Thiruvananthapuram. It has jurisdiction over the 14 districts. The permanent office of the Tribunal is in the District Court Complex at Vanchiyoor, Thiruvananthapuram. The tribunal sits on working days.

Who can submit petitions
Any person aggrieved can submit an appeal against, or request revision of, a notice order or proceedings of the Village Panchayat or Municipality or its Standing Committee for Finance or the Secretary in respect of any matter specified in the schedule appended to the Tribunal for Kerala Local self Government Institutions rules or added to the said schedule by the Government from time to time by notification.   If the concerned Village Panchayat or the Municipality or the Standing Committee for Finance or the Secretary has not taken decision within the prescribed time limit in cases where time limit has been prescribed in the Panchayat act or the Municipality Act or in the Rules, the affected party may in this respect, one can file appeal before the Tribunal.

Mode of submission of petitions
The Appeal/Revision against  the notice/order by the President/chairman or the Secretary of the Grama Panchayat/Municipality/Corporation or against the decision of the Panchayat Committee, Municipal Council or Corporation Council shall be filed in form ‘C’ of the Tribunal Rules.  Appeal/Revision against levy of tax Appeal/Revision shall be filed after remitting the tax demanded in the demand notice. Original/certified  copy of the impugned order/notice/decision shall be produced along with Appeal. The petitioner shall remit Fifty rupees as fee in the Office of the Tribunal or enclose along with the petition a Demand Draft for the same amount drawn in favour of the Tribunal for Local Self Government Institutions, drawn on any of the Nationalized or  Scheduled bank  payable at any bank at the Headquarters of the Tribunal Petition. In addition, Rs. 50/- shall be paid towards Legal Benefit Fund, by affixing Legal Benefit Fund Stamps in the Appeal/Revision Petition . The petitioner shall furnish to the Tribunal an attested copy each of the petition and of the annexed documents also, along with every petition submitted before the Tribunal and in addition shall also submit as many attested copies thereof as the number of counter petitioners. The petitioner may submit petition before the Tribunal on any working day before 3 PM  directly or send the same by registered post, to the   Tribunal for Local Self Government Institutions, District Court Complex, Vanchiyoor P.O,  Thiruvananthapuram, PIN; 695035. Sufficient number of certified copies of the Appeal/Revision and the documents produced along with the Appeal shall be produced with envelopes and the requisite postal stamps for issuing registered notice to the Respondents.
The Tribunal is also empowered to stay the operation of the order or notice, whichever is being challenged in the Appeal/Revision, either till the disposal of the Appeal/Revision or under further orders. Any petitioner intending to get such a stay has to file a separate interlocutory application for the said purpose supported by an affidavit, along with the Appeal/Revision.

Orders of the tribunal
The copies of orders of the Tribunal shall be issued to the parties on application.  No Court fee is required for the application. Copies can be collected from the office during office hours either in person or through authorised representative.  Orders will be issued strictly on date wise seniority basis. After the disposal of the case, on application, all the documents produced in connection with the Appeal/Revision shall be returned to the concerned parties.

References
 Website of Government of Kerala on Tribunal
Website on Decentralisation and Local governance in Kerala
 Report on Tribunal appeared in The Hindu Daily
 
 Government of Kerala : Kerala Panchayat Raj Act 1994
 Government of Kerala : Kerala Municipality Act 1994
Government of Kerala, 1999: The Tribunal for the Kerala Local Government Institutions Rules 1999

Local government in Kerala
Indian Tribunals
1994 establishments in Kerala